is the debut single of Morning Musume's first subgroup, Tanpopo. It was released on November 18, 1998, as an 8 cm CD under the Zetima Records with a catalog number, EPDE-1014. The song was later featured in the group's first album Tanpopo 1 (along with the album version of it) and in their second album All of Tanpopo. It was also featured as the first ending theme to the anime Sorcerous Stabber Orphen. It reached number two on the Japan Oricon charts.

In 2002, an English-language cover was recorded by Charlotte (from Soul II Soul) for the album Cover Morning Musume Hello! Project!.

Track listing 
The lyricist and composer of the songs is Tsunku. "Last Kiss" was arranged by Takao Konishi, while the B-side song was arranged by Yuichi Takahashi, with the help of LH Project.
 "Last Kiss (Single version)"
 
 "Last Kiss (Instrumental)"

Personnel 
 Aya Ishiguro (石黒彩) - vocals
 Kaori Iida (飯田圭織) - vocals
 Mari Yaguchi (矢口真里) - vocals
 Takao Konishi (小西貴雄) - arranger (track 1 and 3)
 Yuichi Takahashi (高橋諭一) - arranger (track 2)
 LH Project - arranger (track 2)

References

External links 
  entry at Hello! Project Official Website
 Last Kiss Up-Front Works 
 Projecthello.com: Last Kiss lyrics, Jikan yo Tomare lyrics

Songs about kissing
Tanpopo songs
1998 singles
Japanese-language songs
Songs written by Tsunku
Juice=Juice songs
Torch songs